Vaux may refer to:

People
Antoine-Alexis Cadet de Vaux (1743–1828), French chemist and pharmacist
Bernard Carra de Vaux (1867–1953), French orientalist who published accounts of his travels in the Middle East
Clotilde de Vaux (1815–1846), French writer and poet
Louis-François Bertin de Vaux (1771–1842), French journalist
Noël Jourda de Vaux (1705–1788), comte de Vaux, seigneur d'Artiac
Roland de Vaux (1903–1971), French Dominican priest and archeologist
Peter of Vaux de Cernay (floruit c.1215), Cistercian monk of Vaux de Cernay Abbey, in what is now Yvelines, northern France
James Hardy Vaux (born 1782, date of death unknown), English-born convict transported to Australia on three separate occasions
Bert Vaux (born 1968), American teacher of phonology and morphology at the University of Cambridge
Calvert Vaux (1824–1895), British-born American architect and landscape designer
Cydra Vaux (1962–2013), American sculptor
David Vaux, award-winning scientist at WEHI, Melbourne, Australia
Ernest Vaux (1865–1925), British Army officer
John Vaux, Deputy Governor of Bombay in 1689
Laurence Vaux (Vose) (1519–1585), an English canon regular and a Catholic martyr
Marc Vaux (born 1932), British artist who rose to prominence in the 1960s
Mary Vaux Walcott (1860–1940). American artist and naturalist known for her watercolor paintings of wildflowers
Meta Vaux Warrick Fuller (1877–1968), African-American artist, notable as the first to make art celebrating Afrocentric themes
Nick Vaux, retired Royal Marine officer, and former commander of 42 Commando during the Falklands War
Richard Vaux (1816–1895), American politician, mayor of Philadelphia, and a member of the U.S. House of Representatives for Pennsylvania
Roberts Vaux (1786–1836), lawyer, jurist, abolitionist, and philanthropist from Philadelphia
William Sandys Wright Vaux (1818–1885), British antiquary of the 19th century
William Sansom Vaux (1811-1882), American mineralogist from Philadelphia
Baron Brougham and Vaux, a title in the Peerage of the United Kingdom
Henry Brougham, 1st Baron Brougham and Vaux (1778–1868), British statesman
William Brougham, 2nd Baron Brougham and Vaux (1795-1886), also known as William Brougham, British barrister and Whig politician
Henry Brougham, 3rd Baron Brougham and Vaux (1836-1927), British aristocrat and civil servant
Victor Brougham, 4th Baron Brougham and Vaux (1909–1967), British peer and politician
Michael Brougham, 5th Baron Brougham and Vaux (born 1938), British peer and a member of the House of Lords
Baron Vaux of Harrowden, a title in the Peerage of England
Nicholas Vaux, 1st Baron Vaux of Harrowden (c. 1460–1523), soldier and courtier in England and an early member of the House of Lords
Thomas Vaux, 2nd Baron Vaux of Harrowden (1509–1556), English poet, the eldest son of Nicholas Vaux, 1st Baron Vaux of Harrowden
William Vaux, 3rd Baron Vaux of Harrowden (c. 1535–1595), English peer
Anne Vaux (c. 1562 – in or after 1637), a wealthy Catholic recusant, the third daughter of William Vaux, 3rd Baron Vaux of Harrowden
Henry Vaux, English recusant, priest smuggler, and poet during the reign of Elizabeth I, eldest child of William Vaux, 3rd Baron Vaux of Harrowden
Edward Vaux, 4th Baron Vaux of Harrowden (1588–1661), English peer, son of George Vaux

Groups and companies
Vaux (band), American alternative rock band
Vaux Breweries, a major brewer based in Sunderland, United Kingdom

Places

Places in Belgium
, a village in the commune of Bastogne, Belgian Luxembourg
, a hamlet in the commune of Gouvy, Belgian Luxembourg
, a section of the Belgian municipality of Villers-le-Bouillet located in the Walloon region in the province of Liège
Vaux-sur-Sûre (Walloon: Li Vå-so-Seure), a Walloon municipality of Belgium located in the province of Luxembourg
List of protected heritage sites in Vaux-sur-Sûre, the protected heritage sites in the Walloon town Vaux-sur-Sûre
, a section of the municipality of Vaux-sur-Sûre

Communes in France (Ardennes department)
Vaux-Champagne, in the Ardennes department in northern France
Vaux-en-Dieulet, in the Ardennes department in northern France
Vaux-lès-Mouron, in the Ardennes department in northern France
Vaux-lès-Mouzon, in the Ardennes department in northern France
Vaux-lès-Rubigny, in the Ardennes department in northern France
Vaux-Montreuil, in the Ardennes department in northern France
Vaux-Villaine, in the Ardennes department in northern France

Other communes in France
Béthancourt-en-Vaux, in the department of Aisne in Picardy in northern France
Burey-en-Vaux, in the Meuse department in Lorraine in northeastern France
Éclusier-Vaux, in the Somme department in Picardie in northern France
Le Frestoy-Vaux, in the Oise department in northern France
Hermival-les-Vaux, in the Calvados department in the Basse-Normandie region in northwestern France
Jours-en-Vaux, in the Côte-d'Or department in eastern France
Mercin-et-Vaux, in the Aisne department in Picardy in northern France
Neurey-en-Vaux, in the Haute-Saône department in the region of Franche-Comté in eastern France
Parigny-les-Vaux, in the Nièvre department in central France
Pont-de-Vaux, in the Ain department in eastern France
Rambluzin-et-Benoite-Vaux, in the Meuse department in Lorraine in north-eastern France
Saint-Denis-de-Vaux, in the Saône-et-Loire department in the region of Bourgogne in eastern France
Saint-Gérand-de-Vaux, in the Allier department in Auvergne in central France
Saint-Germain-des-Vaux, in the Manche department in Normandy in north-western France
Saint-Jean-de-Vaux, in the Saône-et-Loire department in the region of Bourgogne in eastern France
Saint-Laurent-de-Vaux, in the Rhône department in eastern France
Saint-Mard-de-Vaux, in the Saône-et-Loire department in the region of Bourgogne in eastern France
Saint-Pierre-en-Vaux, in the Côte-d'Or department in eastern France
Sainte-Marie-de-Vaux (Senta Marí de Vaus), in the Haute-Vienne department in the Limousin region in west-central France
Sury-en-Vaux, in the Cher department in the Centre region of France
Vaux, Allier (Vaus), in the Allier department in Auvergne in central France
Vaux, Haute-Garonne, in the Haute-Garonne department in southwestern France
Vaux, Moselle, in the Moselle department in Lorraine in north-eastern France
Vaux, Vienne (or Vaux-en-Couhé), in the Vienne department in the Poitou-Charentes region in western France
Vaux-Andigny, in the Aisne department in Picardy in northern France
Vaux-devant-Damloup, in the Meuse department in Lorraine in north-eastern France
Vaux-en-Amiénois, in the Somme department in Picardie in northern France
Vaux-en-Beaujolais, in the Rhône department in eastern France
Vaux-en-Bugey, in the Ain department in eastern France
Vaux-en-Pré, in the Saône-et-Loire department in the region of Bourgogne in eastern France
Vaux-en-Vermandois, in the Aisne department in Picardy in northern France
Vaux-et-Chantegrue, in the Doubs department in the Franche-Comté region in eastern France
Vaux-Lavalette, in the Charente department in southwestern France
Vaux-le-Moncelot, in the Haute-Saône department in the region of Franche-Comté in eastern France
Vaux-le-Pénil, in the Seine-et-Marne department in the Île-de-France region in north-central France
Vaux-lès-Palameix, in the Meuse department in Lorraine in north-eastern France
Vaux-les-Prés, in the Doubs department in the Franche-Comté region in eastern France
Vaux-lès-Saint-Claude, in the Jura department in the Franche-Comté region in eastern France
Vaux-Marquenneville, in the Somme department in Picardie in northern France
Vaux-Rouillac, in the Charente department in southwestern France
Vaux-Saules, in the Côte-d'Or department in eastern France
Vaux-sous-Aubigny, in the Haute-Marne department in north-eastern France
Vaux-sur-Aure, in the Calvados department in the Basse-Normandie region in northwestern France
Vaux-sur-Blaise, in the Haute-Marne department in north-eastern France
Vaux-sur-Eure, in the Eure department in Haute-Normandie in northern France
Vaux-sur-Lunain, in the Seine-et-Marne department in the Île-de-France region in north-central France
Vaux-sur-Mer, in the Charente-Maritime department in southwestern France
Vaux-sur-Poligny, in the Jura department in the Franche-Comté region in eastern France
Vaux-sur-Saint-Urbain, in the Haute-Marne department in north-eastern France
Vaux-sur-Seine, in the Yvelines department in the Île-de-France in north-central France
Vaux-sur-Seulles, in the Calvados department in the Basse-Normandie region in northwestern France
Vaux-sur-Somme, in the Somme department in Picardie in northern France
Vaux-sur-Vienne, in the Vienne department in the Poitou-Charentes region in western France

Other places
Canal de Pont-de-Vaux, a canal in eastern France connecting the Saône at Fleurville to Pont-de-Vaux
Canton of Pont-de-Vaux, an administrative division in eastern France
Étangs de Vaux et de Baye, a group of lakes in Nièvre, Burgundy, France
Fort Vaux, a fortress in Vaux-devant-Damloup, Meuse, France
Lac des Vaux, a lake above Verbier in the canton of Valais, Switzerland
Notre-Dame-en-Vaux, a church at Châlons-en-Champagne, France
Roberts Vaux Junior High School, a historic high school building located in the North Central neighborhood of Philadelphia, Pennsylvania
Vaux Moysi, also li Vaux Moysi, Old French name of Wu'ayra Castle; Crusader ruin near Petra, Jordan
Vaux-de-Cernay Abbey, a Cistercian monastery in northern France (Ile-de-France), situated in Cernay-la-Ville, in the Diocese of Versailles, Yvelines
Vaux-le-Vicomte, a baroque château in Maincy, France
Vaux-sur-Morges, a municipality in the Swiss canton of Vaud, located in the district of Morges
Vaux (crater), on Mars

Other
De Vaux, an automobile produced by the De Vaux-Hall Motors Company of Grand Rapids, Michigan and Oakland, California
De Vaux Continental, an automobile produced by the Continental-De Vaux Company in Grand Rapids, Michigan
USS Richard Vaux (1864), a 120-ton canal boat, purchased by the Union Navy at Philadelphia, Pennsylvania
Vaux's swift (Chaetura vauxi), a small swift native to North America and northern South America

See also
 Fawkes (disambiguation)
Vaulx (disambiguation)